Michail Elgin and Alexandre Kudryavtsev were the defending champions; however, they both chose not to participate this year.
Oleksandr Nedovyesov and Ivan Sergeyev won in the final against Divij Sharan and Vishnu Vardhan.

Seeds

Draw

Draw

References
 Doubles Draw

Samarkand Challenger - Doubles
Samarkand Challenger